The Prevotella-2 RNA motif is a conserved RNA structure that was discovered by bioinformatics.
Energetically stable tetraloops often occur in this motif.
Prevotella-2 motif RNAs are found in the bacterial genus Prevotella.

Nearly all Prevotella-2 RNAs occur upstream of genes that encode sodium/proton antiporters.  These data suggest that the RNAs function as cis-regulatory elements.  However, one Prevotella-2 RNA is located upstream of a gene encoded on the opposite DNA strand, which would be unlikely for a cis-regulatory function in bacteria.  Therefore, it is also possible that Prevotella-2 RNAs are small RNAs that operate in trans.  In this model, their association with sodium/proton antiporters would be a coincidence.  Most Prevotella-2 RNAs are followed by a Rho-independent transcription terminator.  If the RNAs function in cis, these transcript terminators might be a part of the mechanism used to achieve gene regulation. If, on the other hand, Prevotella-2 RNAs correspond to small RNAs, the terminators may simply terminate the transcript containing this non-coding RNA.

References

Non-coding RNA